The Toledo Cup was a trophy presented in the United States from 1934 to 1936 to the college football team recognized as national champions by a group of 250 sports editors from newspapers across the country.

The poll's rules stated that the first team to win the traveling trophy three times would retain permanent possession of the cup. The Minnesota Golden Gophers were promptly voted No. 1 for 1934, 1935, and 1936 and claimed the trophy. The Toledo Cup is currently displayed in the lobby of the Gibson-Nagurski Athletic Center at the University of Minnesota.

Winners

References

College football championship trophies